Čudinska planina or Chudinska planina, is a mountain on the border of Serbia and Bulgaria, near the town of Bosilegrad. Its highest peak Aramlija has an elevation of 1496 meters above sea level.

References

Mountains of Serbia
Mountains of Bulgaria
Landforms of Blagoevgrad Province
Rhodope mountain range